Ben "The Guvner" Edwards (born 17 February 1985) is an Australian heavyweight kickboxer, boxer and mixed martial artist. He is the K-1 World Grand Prix 2010 in Canberra tournament champion. Edwards won the tournament by three 1st-round KO's the fastest win in K-1 history in total time of 3 minutes and 28 seconds breaking the previous record held by Jerome Le Banner of 4 minutes and 4 seconds in K-1 World Grand Prix 2001 in Osaka. Fighting out of Bulldog Gym, Canberra, Australia, he has competed in the K-1, Capital Punishment, Kings of Kombat, SUPERKOMBAT and It's Showtime promotions and is currently signed to GLORY.

Biography and career
Ben Edwards was born in Sydney and has been living in Canberra since he was 4, currently residing in Queanbeyan. Edwards played Rugby league until he was 19. He represented the Canberra Raiders sides in both Harold Matthews Cup and SG Ball sides. He went to Dickson College where he played first grade for the Queanbeyan Blues.

Ben Edwards started kickboxing in 2003 at the Bulldog Gym under late John Verran his coach and mentor.

After winning multiple ISKA kickboxing titles he made his K-1 debut at the K-1 World Grand Prix 2010 Canberra. He knocked out all three of his opponents in the first round, including tournament favourite, Paul Slowinski, whom he had lost to twice in his career. He still maintains the record for the fastest kickboxing tournament in K-1 history, at 3 minutes and 28 seconds.
At the K-1 Final 16, in the main event he lost to the eventual World Grand Prix champion Alistair Overeem in the first round.

Following the loss he decisioned Carter Williams and knocked out Mighty Mo in 2011. He finished the year with a loss against Roman Kleibl in the semi-finals of the SUPERKOMBAT Fight Club tournament. After being dropped by Daniel Sam in the quarter finals he finished off his opponent in the second round. Despite dropping Kleibl in the second round he was TKOed in the final round after running out of energy.

He started out 2012 with a decision win against Ricardo van den Bos. He is now scheduled to face Rico Verhoeven on March, 17 in Australia.

He faced Raul Cătinaş at the K-1 World Grand Prix 2012 in Tokyo Final 16 on 14 October 2012 and won via TKO in round two.

Edwards was drawn against Zabit Samedov in the quarter-finals of the K-1 World Grand Prix 2012 Final, held on 15 March 2013 in Zagreb, Croatia. However, he decided not to compete as he was already booked to fight Paul Slowinski for the fourth time on 23 March 2013 in Canberra, Australia at Capital Punishment 7. He defeated Slowinski by decision.

He joined Glory in July 2013.

He won the vacant Kings of Kombat Heavyweight Championship with a majority decision win over Cătălin Moroșanu at Kings of Kombat 10 in Melbourne, Australia on 7 September 2013, relying heavily on low kicks in the fight rather than use his usual brawling style.

In a slugfest at Glory 12: New York - Lightweight World Championship Tournament in New York City on 23 November 2013, Edwards landed numerous unanswered shots on Jamal Ben Saddik throughout round three before eventually putting him away with a big right hand towards the end.

He was initially set to face Errol Zimmerman in the main event of Glory 15: Istanbul in Istanbul, Turkey on 12 April 2014 but the match was transferred to the semi-finals of the Glory 16: Denver - Heavyweight Contendership Tournament in Broomfield, Colorado, US on 3 May 2014. He lost to Zimmerman via TKO, suffering two knockdowns in the first round.

Titles

Kickboxing
 2013 Kings of Kombat Heavyweight champion
 2010 K-1 World Grand Prix in Canberra champion
 2009 ISKA Super-heavyweight World champion (2 title def.)
 2008 ISKA Super-heavyweight South Pacific title

Mixed Martial Arts
 2013 C8 Heavyweight Champion

Boxing
2015 Australian Heavyweight Champion

Kickboxing record

|-
|-  bgcolor="#FFBBBB"
| 2015-10-09 || Loss ||align=left| Jahfarr Wilnis || Glory 24: Denver – Heavyweight Contender Tournament, Semi-finals || Denver, Colorado, USA || TKO (2 knockdowns) || 2 || 1:36
|-  bgcolor="#FFBBBB"
| 2014-05-03 || Loss ||align=left| Errol Zimmerman || Glory 16: Denver – Heavyweight Contender Tournament, Semi-finals || Broomfield, Colorado, USA || TKO (right hook) || 1 || 2:50
|-
|-  bgcolor="#CCFFCC"
| 2013-11-23 || Win ||align=left| Jamal Ben Saddik || Glory 12: New York || New York City, USA || KO (right hook) || 3 || 2:52
|-
|-  bgcolor="#CCFFCC"
| 2013-09-07 || Win ||align=left| Cătălin Moroșanu || Kings of Kombat 10 || Melbourne || Decision (majority) || 3 || 3:00
|-
! style=background:white colspan=9 |
|-
|-  bgcolor="#CCFFCC"
| 2013-03-23 || Win ||align=left| Paul Slowinski || Capital Punishment 7 || Canberra, Australia || Decision || 3 || 3:00
|-
|-  bgcolor="#CCFFCC"
| 2012-10-14 || Win ||align=left| Raul Cătinaș || K-1 World Grand Prix 2012 in Tokyo Final 16, First Round || Tokyo, Japan || TKO (referee stoppage) || 2 || 2:24
|-  bgcolor= "#FFBBBB"
| 2012-03-17 || Loss ||align=left| Rico Verhoeven || Capital Punishment 5 || Canberra, Australia || Decision || 3 || 3:00
|-  bgcolor="#CCFFCC"
| 2012-01-28 || Win ||align=left| Ricardo van den Bos || It's Showtime 2012 in Leeuwarden || Leeuwarden, Netherlands || Decision (unanimous) || 3 || 3:00
|-  bgcolor="#FFBBBB"
| 2011-11-17 || Loss ||align=left| Roman Kleibl || SUPERKOMBAT Fight Club, Semi-finals || Oradea, Romania|| KO (Left Hook) ||  3 || 2:38
|-  bgcolor="#CCFFCC"
| 2011-11-17 || Win ||align=left| Daniel Sam || SUPERKOMBAT Fight Club, Quarter Finals || Oradea, Romania || TKO (Referee Stoppage) || 2 || 2:43
|-
|-  bgcolor="#CCFFCC"
| 2011-07-30 || Win ||align=left| Mighty Mo || Capital Punishment 4|| Canberra, Australia || KO (Knee) || 2 || 2:18
|-
|-  bgcolor="#CCFFCC"
| 2011-04-02 || Win ||align=left| Carter Williams || Kings of Kombat 3|| Keysborough, Australia || Decision (Majority) || 3 || 3:00
|-  bgcolor="#FFBBBB"
| 2010-10-02 || Loss ||align=left| Alistair Overeem || K-1 World Grand Prix 2010 in Seoul Final 16 || Seoul, Korea || KO (right hook/3 knockdowns) || 1 || 2:08
|-
|-  bgcolor="#CCFFCC"
| 2010-07-10 || Win ||align=left| Paul Slowinski || K-1 World Grand Prix 2010 in Canberra, final || Canberra, Australia || TKO (Three knockdowns/punches)  || 1 || 1:24
|-
! style=background:white colspan=9 |
|-
|-  bgcolor="#CCFFCC"
| 2010-07-10 || Win ||align=left| Tafa Misapati || K-1 World Grand Prix 2010 in Canberra, semi-final || Canberra, Australia || TKO (Three knockdowns/left uppercut) || 1 || 0:59
|-
|-  bgcolor="#CCFFCC"
| 2010-07-10 || Win ||align=left| Faisal Zakaria || K-1 World Grand Prix 2010 in Canberra, quarter final || Canberra, Australia || KO (Left hook) || 1 || 1:03
|-
|-  bgcolor="#CCFFCC"
| 2010-04-01 || Win ||align=left| Mick Siebert || Marrara International Stadium || Darwin, Northern Territory || TKO (Referee stoppage/shin injury) || 1 || 0:30
|-
|-  bgcolor="#CCFFCC"
| 2010-02-20 || Win ||align=left| Thor Hoopman || Capital Punishment || Canberra, Australia || TKO (Referee stoppage) || 1 || 
|-
! style=background:white colspan=9 |
|-
|-  bgcolor="#FFBBBB"
| 2009-10-09 || Loss ||align=left| Paul Slowinski || Evolution 18 || Melbourne || TKO (Low kicks) || 3 || 
|-
! style=background:white colspan=9 |
|-
|-  bgcolor="#CCFFCC"
| 2009-08-29 || Win ||align=left| Andrew Peck || World Domination II, Rydges Lakeside Hotel || Canberra, Australia || TKO (Referee stoppage) || 1 || 2:24
|-
! style=background:white colspan=9 |
|-
|-  bgcolor="#CCFFCC"
| 2009-04-04 || Win ||align=left| Rick Cheek || World Domination || Canberra, Australia || KO (Right cross) || 1 || 1:39
|-
! style=background:white colspan=9 |
|-
|-  bgcolor="#CCFFCC"
| 2008–11 || Win ||align=left| Mick Siebert ||  || Australia || KO (Left hook) || 2 || 1:03
|-
! style=background:white colspan=9 |
|-
|-  bgcolor="#FFBBBB"
| 2008-04-20 || Loss ||align=left| Nobu Hayashi || Titans || Tokyo, Japan || Decision (Split) || 3 || 3:00
|-  bgcolor="#CCFFCC"
| 2008-03-29 || Win ||align=left| Ramazan Ramazanov || Xplosion 18 Super Fights || Sydney || KO (Left hook) || 2 || 
|-  bgcolor="#CCFFCC"
| 2007–12 || Win ||align=left| Duško Basrak || || Serbia || KO || 2 ||
|-  bgcolor="#FFBBBB"
| 2007-03-03 || Loss ||align=left| Jason Suttie || Philip Lam Promotions || Auckland, New Zealand || Decision (Split) || 3 || 3:00
|-
|-  bgcolor="#CCFFCC"
| 2006-11-11 || Win ||align=left| Erik Nosa || N&J promotion presents "Men at War" || Canberra, Australia || KO || 2 || 
|-
! style=background:white colspan=9 |
|-
|-  bgcolor="#c5d2ea"
| 2006-08-04 || Draw ||align=left| Erik Nosa || War on the North Shore III || Brookvale, New South Wales || Decision draw || 3 || 3:00
|-  bgcolor="#FFBBBB"
| 2006-06-24 || Loss ||align=left| Peter Sampson || K-1 Kings of Oceania 2006 Round 1 || Auckland, New Zealand || Decision || 3 || 3:00
|-  bgcolor="#FFBBBB"
| 2006-03-05 || Loss ||align=left| Jay Hepi || K-1 World Grand Prix 2006 in Auckland || Auckland, New Zealand || Decision (Majority) || 3 || 3:00
|-  bgcolor="#FFBBBB"
| 2005-12-10 || Loss ||align=left| Paul Slowinski || K-1 Kings of Oceania 2005 Round 3 || Gold Coast, Australia || KO || 2 || 
|-  bgcolor="#CCFFCC"
| 2005-10-08 || Win ||align=left| Sidney Asiata || K-1 Kings of Oceania 2005 Round 2 || Auckland, New Zealand || Ext. R Decision || 4 || 3:00
|-  bgcolor="#CCFFCC"
| 2005-06-17 || Win ||align=left| Martin Opetaia || JNI promotion "50th Show" || Hurstville, New South Wales || || || 
|-  bgcolor="#CCFFCC"
| 2005-04-29 || Win ||align=left| Jason Boneham || JNI "Unfinished Business" || Hurstville, New South Wales || || ||
|-  bgcolor="#CCFFCC"
| 2005-02-01 || Win ||align=left| arren Berry || Jabout Show @ Penrith Panthers || Penrith, New South Wales || || ||
|-  bgcolor="#CCFFCC"
| 2004-08-20 || Win ||align=left| Wesam El Dahabi || JNI "Wicked Ways" || Hurstville, New South Wales || || || 
|-

|-  bgcolor="#CCFFCC"
| 2014-11-15 || Win ||align=left| Tafa Misipati  || Hellenic Club of Canberra || Canberra, Australia || KO || 1 ||  || 4–0–1
|-
|-  bgcolor="#c5d2ea"
| 2011-05-13 || Draw ||align=left| Michael Kirby || The Melbourne Pavilion || Flemington, Victoria, Australia || Decision (Split) || 10 || 3:00 || 3–0–1
|-
! style=background:white colspan=9 |
|-
|-  bgcolor="#CCFFCC"
| 2011-02-18 || Win ||align=left| Leamy Tato || Rydges Lakeside Canberra Hotel || Canberra, Australian Capital Territory || KO || 1 ||  || 3–0
|-  bgcolor="#CCFFCC"
| 2009-07-23 || Win ||align=left| Sam Leuii || AIS Arena || Bruce, Australian Capital Territory || TKO || 1 ||  || 2–0
|-  bgcolor="#CCFFCC"
| 2007-04-13 || Win ||align=left| John Hopoate || Erindale Vikings Club || Wanniassa, Australian Capital Territory || TKO || 1 || 1:29 || 1–0
|-
| colspan=9 | Legend:

Mixed martial arts record

|-
|Loss
|align=center|5–1
|Francimar Barroso
|Decision (unanimous)
|PFL 6
|
|align=center| 3
|align=center| 5:00
|Atlantic City, New Jersey, United States
|
|-
|Win
|align=center| 5–0
|Wallace To'o
|TKO
|MFC 29
|
|align=center|2
|align=center|
|Canberra, Australia
|
|-
|Win
|align=center| 4–0
|Felise Leniu
|TKO
|Hex Fight Series 14
|
|align=center|1
|align=center|
|Melbourne, Australia
|
|-
|Win
|align=center| 3–0
|Jeremy Joiner
|KO
|MFC 26
|
|align=center|1
|align=center|1:35
|Canberra, Australia
|
|-
|Win
|align=center| 2–0
|Brandon Sosoli
|TKO (submission to strikes)
|MFC 25
|
|align=center|1
|align=center|3:53
|Canberra, Australia
|
|-
|Win
|align=center| 1–0
|Donnie Lester
|TKO
|Combat8:03
|
|align=center|1
|align=center|
|Sydney
|MMA debut. Wins C8 Heavyweight Title.
|-

See also
List of male kickboxers
List of K-1 events

References

External links

 
Profile at K-1

1985 births
Living people
Australian male boxers
Heavyweight boxers
Australian male kickboxers
Heavyweight kickboxers
Australian male mixed martial artists
Heavyweight mixed martial artists
Mixed martial artists utilizing boxing
Mixed martial artists utilizing kickboxing
Sportsmen from New South Wales
Kickboxers from Sydney
Glory kickboxers
SUPERKOMBAT kickboxers